Alvania nix is a species of sea snail, a marine gastropod mollusk in the family Rissoidae.

Original description
 Poppe G.T., Tagaro S.P. & Goto Y. (2018). New marine species from the Central Philippines. Visaya. 5(1): 91-135. page(s): 98, pl. 5 figs 4-5.

References

Rissoidae
Gastropods described in 2018